Gannavaram Assembly constituency is a constituency in Krishna district of Andhra Pradesh, representing the state legislative assembly in India. It is one of the seven assembly segments of Machilipatnam (Lok Sabha constituency), along with Gudivada, Pedana, Machilipatnam, Avanigadda, Pamarru SC and Penamaluru.

Vallabhaneni Vamsi Mohan is the present MLA of the constituency, who won the 2019 Andhra Pradesh Legislative Assembly election from Telugu Desam Party. As of March 2019, there are a total of 258,031 electors in the constituency.

Extent of the constituency 
The four mandals that form the assembly constituency are:

Member of Legislative Assembly

Election results

Assembly elections 2014

Assembly elections 2009

See also 
 List of constituencies of Andhra Pradesh Legislative Assembly

References 

Assembly constituencies of Andhra Pradesh
Krishna district